Hugh Anthony Glanmor Williams (6 March 1904 – 7 December 1969) was a British actor and dramatist of Welsh descent.

Early life and career
Hugh Anthony Glanmor Williams (nicknamed "Tam") was born at Bexhill-on-Sea, Sussex to Hugh Dafydd Anthony Williams (1869-1905) and Hilda (née Lewis). The Williams family lived at Bedford Park, in Chiswick, West London. His paternal grandfather was Hugh Williams (1796-1874), a Welsh solicitor and anti-establishment political activist. He trained at the Royal Academy of Dramatic Art. He was a popular film and stage actor, who became a major film star in the British cinema of the 1930s. In 1930 he toured America in the cast of the R.C. Sheriff play Journey's End and appeared in his first film Charley's Aunt during a spell in Hollywood. He then returned to Britain and became a mainstay of the British film industry. He made 57 film appearances as an actor between 1930 and 1967. He collaborated with his second wife on several plays, such as The Grass Is Greener and the screenplay for the subsequent film. He died from an Aortic aneurysm, aged 65, in London.

Marriages and grandchildren
He was married twice:
Gwynne Whitby (1925–1940) (two children)
Lou Williams
Prue Williams
Margaret Vyner (1940–1969) (three children):
Hugo Williams (born 1942), poet
Simon Williams (born 1946), actor who married Belinda Carroll and Lucy Fleming
Polly Williams (1950-2004), actress who married Nigel Havers
and his grandchildren included:
Kate Dunn, actress
Amy Williams, actress
Tam Williams, actor

Filmography

 Charley's Aunt (1930) as Charlie Wykeham
 A Night in Montmartre (1931) as Philip Borell
 A Gentleman of Paris (1931) as Gaston Gerrard
 Down Our Street (1932) as Charlie Stubbs
 Insult (1932) as Captain Ramon Nadir
 In a Monastery Garden (1932) as Paul Ferrier
 White Face (1932) as Michael Seeley
 Rome Express (1932) as Tony
 This Acting Business (1933) as Hugh
 After Dark (1933) as Richard Morton
 The Jewel (1933) as Frank Hallam
 Bitter Sweet (1933) as Vincent
 Sorrell and Son (1934) as Kit Sorrell as an Adult
 Elinor Norton (1934) as Tony Norton
 All Men Are Enemies (1934) as Tony Clarendon
 Outcast Lady (1934) as Gerald March
 Lieutenant Daring R.N. (1935) as Lt. Bob Daring 
 David Copperfield (1935) as Steerforth
 Let's Live Tonight (1935) as Brian Kerry
 The Happy Family (1936) as Victor Hutt
 The Last Journey (1936) as Gerald Winter
 The Amateur Gentleman (1936) as Ronald
 Her Last Affaire (1936) as Alan Heriot
 The Man Behind the Mask (1936) as Nick Barclay
 The Windmill (1937) as Peter Ellington
 Side Street Angel (1937) as Peter
 The Perfect Crime (1937) as Charles Brown
 Gypsy (1937) as Brazil
 Brief Ecstasy (1937) as Jim Wyndham
 Premiere (1938) as Rene Nissen 
 The Dark Stairway (1938) as Dr. Thurlow
 Bank Holiday (1938) as Geoffrey 
 His Lordship Goes to Press (1939) as Lord Bill Wilmer
 Wuthering Heights (1939) as Hindley Earnshaw
 Dead Men Tell No Tales (1939) as Detective Inspector Martin
 Inspector Hornleigh (1939) as Bill Gordon, Ann's Brother
 The Dark Eyes of London (1939) as Det. Insp. Larry Holt 
 Ships with Wings (1942) as Wagner, Papa's Pilot
 The Day Will Dawn (1942) as Colin Metcalfe 
 One of Our Aircraft Is Missing (1942) as Frank Shelley, Observer/Navigator in B for Bertie
 Secret Mission (1942) as Major Peter Garnett
 Talk About Jacqueline (1942) as Dr. Michael Thomas
 A Girl in a Million (1946) as Tony
 Take My Life (1947) as Nicholas Talbot
 An Ideal Husband (1947) as Sir Robert Chiltern
 Elizabeth of Ladymead (1948) as John Beresford in 1946
 The Blind Goddess (1948) as Lord Brasted
 The Romantic Age (1949) as Arnold Dickson 
 Paper Orchid (1949) as Frank McSweeney
 Gift Horse (1952) as Captain David G. Wilson, Division Commander 
 The Holly and the Ivy (1952) as Richard Wyndham
 Twice Upon a Time (1953) as James Turner
 The Fake (1953) as Sir Richard Aldingham
 Star of My Night (1954) as Arnold Whitman
 The Intruder (1953) as Tim Ross
 Khartoum (1966) as Lord Hartington
 Doctor Faustus (1967) as Scholar

Writing credits
 The Grass is Greener (play) (1952) (book) 
 Plaintiff in a Pretty Hat (1957) (play) (with Margaret Williams)
 The Grass Is Greener (1960) (screenplay)
 The Irregular Verb To Love (1961) (play) (with Margaret Williams)
 Charlie Girl (book) (with Margaret Williams)

Selected stage roles
 Journey's End (1930)
 Grand Hotel (1931)
 While Parents Sleep (1932)
 Flowers of the Forest (1935)

Notable television appearances
 Masterpiece Playhouse in episode: Richard III (episode No. 1.2) (1950)
 The Count of Monte Cristo playing Millet in episode: "Flight to Calais"
 Colonel March of Scotland Yard playing Harold Hartley in episode: "The Talking Head" (episode No. 1.11) (1956)
 Douglas Fairbanks, Jr., Presents as Shayar (sic!) in "Scheherezade" (episode No. 5.10) (1956)
 The New Adventures of Charlie Chan playing Inspector Marlowe in episode: "Dateline Execution" (episode No. 1.18) (1957)
 The New Adventures of Charlie Chan playing Inspector Marlowe in episode: "No Future for Frederick" (episode No. 1.23) (1958)
 The New Adventures of Charlie Chan playing Inspector Marlowe in episode: "Safe Deposit" (episode No. 1.24) (1958)

References

Bibliography
 Sweet, Matthew. Shepperton Babylon: The Lost Worlds of British Cinema. Faber and Faber, 2005.

External links

1904 births
1969 deaths
English people of Welsh descent
English male film actors
English male stage actors
English male television actors
People from Bexhill-on-Sea
Deaths from throat cancer
Deaths from cancer in England
20th-century English male actors
Male actors from Sussex
20th-century English dramatists and playwrights
English male dramatists and playwrights
Alumni of RADA
20th-century English male writers